Is This Tomorrow? is a comic strip, created by Kelly Shane and Woody Compton, begun as a college newspaper feature in 1991 and revived as a webcomic in 2003.  The comic is experimental in form and though it includes recurring characters, the subject matter and style often varies from strip to strip.  The name was taken from the anti-Communist comic book Is This Tomorrow published in 1947 by the Catechetical Guild Educational Society of St. Paul, Minnesota.

History 
In its original incarnation, the strip appeared on a semi-regular basis from 1991 to 1992 in the Florida Flambeau, a student-run newspaper affiliated with Florida State University and Florida A&M in Tallahassee, FL.

The strip was revived as a webcomic on July 14, 2003, and ran weekly until June 7, 2004.  Occasional strips were posted in 2004 and 2005.
On September 4, 2006, the strip began a weekly series titled Aether Transmission, which is still ongoing.  Though still varying in subject matter, writing style and graphic presentation, these strips are uniform in size and employ reoccurring characters.

3-D and other special strips 
Is This Tomorrow? has done strips and features utilizing 3-D, including the first anaglyphic 3-D webcomic, "First Anniversary Comic (in 3-D)" (also titled "Atheists From Outer Space"), on July 12, 2004.  The July 12, 2010 comic "Post-Modern Love in 1.5-D" utilizes anaglyphic 3-D glasses to allow two images to appear in the last panel, letting the reader choose between a happy or unhappy ending.  The strip "Hypno-Illusio-Vision" (August 2, 2010) uses an optical illusion as part of the story and design.

The comic's creators collaborated with musician Coconut Monkeyrocket on the December 21, 2009 strip "I.T.T. Breaks the Sound Barrier ," a comic utilizing sound loops.

Reprints 
The strip "Thomas Pynchon: Man of Mystery" was reprinted as an accompany graphic to an article in the 2009 edition of the Encyclopædia Universalis, a French language encyclopedia.

Texts from the strips "The Annotated Steve Ditko Story Part 1" and "Steve Ditko Part 2" were reprinted as a biography of Steve Ditko in The Thunder Agents Companion (TwoMorrows Publishing), edited by Jon B. Cooke.

See also
 Is This Tomorrow

References

External links 

The World of Woody

American comic strips
American comedy webcomics
1991 comics debuts
1992 comics endings
2003 webcomic debuts